Montero Lamar Hill (born April 9, 1999), known by his stage name Lil Nas X, is an American rapper, singer, and songwriter. He rose to prominence with the release of his country rap single "Old Town Road", which first achieved viral popularity in early 2019 before climbing music charts internationally and becoming diamond certified by November of that same year, moving over ten million certified units in streaming and sales combined.

"Old Town Road" spent 19 weeks atop the U.S. Billboard Hot 100 chart, becoming the longest-running number-one song since the chart debuted in 1958. Several remixes of the song were released, the most popular of which featured country singer Billy Ray Cyrus. As "Old Town Road" was atop the Hot 100, Lil Nas X came out as gay, becoming the only artist to do so while having a number-one record.

Following the success of "Old Town Road", Lil Nas X released his debut extended play, titled 7, which spawned two further singles⁠, with "Panini" peaking at number five and "Rodeo" (featuring Cardi B or Nas) peaking at number 22 on the Hot 100. His debut studio album, Montero (2021), was supported by the chart-topping singles "Montero (Call Me by Your Name)" and "Industry Baby" (with Jack Harlow) and the top-ten single "Thats What I Want", and was nominated for Album of the Year at the 64th Annual Grammy Awards.

Lil Nas X was the most-nominated male artist at the 62nd Annual Grammy Awards, where he ultimately won awards for Best Music Video and Best Pop Duo/Group Performance. "Old Town Road" earned him two MTV Video Music Awards including Song of the Year, and the American Music Award for Favorite Rap/Hip Hop Song; Lil Nas X is also the first openly LGBT Black artist to win a Country Music Association award. Time named him as one of the 25 most influential people on the Internet in 2019, and he was named on the Forbes 30 Under 30 list in 2020.

Early life and education
Montero Lamar Hill was born in Lithia Springs, Georgia, a small city outside Atlanta, on April 9, 1999. He was named after the Mitsubishi Montero. His parents divorced when he was six, and he settled in the Bankhead Courts housing project with his mother and grandmother. Three years later, he moved in with his father, a gospel singer, north of the city in Austell, Georgia. Although initially reluctant to leave, he later regarded it as an important decision, "There's so much shit going on in Atlanta—if I would have stayed there, I would have fallen in with the wrong crowd." He started "using the Internet heavily right around the time when memes started to become their own form of entertainment"; about when he was 13.

He spent much of his teenage years alone, and turned to the Internet, "particularly Twitter, creating memes that showed his disarming wit and pop-culture savvy." His teenage years also saw him struggling with his coming out to himself as being gay; he prayed that it was just a phase, but around 16 or 17 he came to accept it. He began playing trumpet in the fourth grade and was first chair by his junior high years, but quit out of fear of looking uncool.

Hill attended Lithia Springs High School, from which he graduated in 2017. He then enrolled at the University of West Georgia, where he majored in computer science, but later dropped out after one year to pursue a musical career. During this time, he stayed with his sister and supported himself with jobs at Zaxby's restaurants and the Six Flags Over Georgia theme park. In September 2019 he revisited his high school to perform a surprise concert.

Career

2015–2017: Internet personality
Hill said he began to isolate himself from "outside-of-class activities" during his teenage years. He spent large amounts of time online in hopes of building a following as an internet personality to promote his work, but was unsure what to focus on creatively. In a Rolling Stone interview he stated, "I was doing Facebook comedy videos, then I moved over to Instagram, and then I hopped on Twitter ... where I really was a master. That was the first place where I could go viral." He also posted short-format comedy videos on Facebook and Vine.

During this period, he reportedly created and ran Nicki Minaj fan accounts on Twitter, including one called "@NasMaraj", according to a New York Magazine investigation. In 2017, this account gained attention for its flash fiction-style interactive "scenario threads" popularized on Twitter using dashboard app TweetDeck. The investigation linked @NasMaraj to the practice of "Tweetdecking", or using multiple accounts in collaboration to artificially make certain tweets go viral. The @NasMaraj account was suspended by Twitter due to "violating spam policies". After the suspension of @NasMaraj, New York Magazine's investigation concluded that he subsequently opened a new account with handle "@NasMarai", and that his current Twitter account at the time was a repurposed version of that "@NasMarai" account with a changed handle. After media reports linked Lil Nas X to the Minaj fan accounts, he called the reports a "misunderstanding", effectively denying having run the accounts. However, in May 2020, Lil Nas X admitted, in a tweet, to being a fan of Minaj. He explained why he initially denied it, stating that if people knew he was a fan of hers, they would think he was gay: "People will assume if you had an entire fan page dedicated to nicki u are gay. and the rap/music industry ain't exactly built or accepting of gay men yet". On June 17, 2020, Minaj responded to Nas, tweeting "It was a bit of a sting when you denied being a barb, but I understand. Congratulations on building up your confidence to speak your truth". Lil Nas apologized to Minaj, saying he "felt so bad, hoping u wouldn't see my denial". The @NasMarai account was later mentioned in a New York Times Magazine article, which described Hill as having spent "every waking hour online, tweeting as @nasmaraj". It is also referenced in the music video for "Sun Goes Down", which shows Lil Nas X's many struggles growing up as a closeted teen and embracing his sexuality; he is seen tweeting while in high school from an account named "nasmiraj" as the lyrics "I'd be by the phone, stanning Nicki morning into dawn" play.

Sometime in the year 2018, Hill landed on music as a path to success, and started writing and recording songs in his closet. He adopted the name Lil Nas X, which is a tribute to the rapper Nas. On July 24, 2018, Lil Nas released his first mixtape Nasarati on SoundCloud, though it was not received with immediate fame; Nasarati would be removed from streaming services soon after the release of Old Town Road due to a copyright conflict and therefore would never gain significant traction. In late October 2018, he happened to hear the beat that would become "Old Town Road".

2018–2019: Breakthrough with "Old Town Road" and 7 

On December 3, 2018, Lil Nas X released the country rap song "Old Town Road". He bought the beat for the song anonymously on beat-selling platform BeatStars from Dutch producer YoungKio for $30; it samples Nine Inch Nails' track "34 Ghosts IV" from their sixth studio album Ghosts I–IV (2008). He recorded at a "humble" Atlanta studio, CinCoYo, on their "$20 Tuesdays" taking less than an hour. Lil Nas X began creating memes to promote "Old Town Road" before it was picked up by short-form video social media TikTok users. TikTok encourages its 500 million global users to "endless imitation", with videos generating copies usually using the same music; the "app's frantic churn of content ...acts as a potent incubator for viral music hits." Lil Nas X estimated he made about 100 memes to promote it; the song went viral in early 2019 due to the #Yeehaw Challenge meme on TikTok. Millions of users posted videos of themselves dressed as a wrangler or cowgirl, with most #yeehaw videos using the song for their soundtrack; as of July 2019, they have been seen more than 67 million times. Another core audience tied to social media is children who are hidden in the statistics of adult listeners. Quartz.com says the song certainly owes part of its success to the demographic, and notes they are attracted to the song being repetitive, easy to sing along to, and using lyrics about riding horses and tractors, which children can relate to. It debuted at number 83 on the Billboard Hot 100 chart, later climbing to number one. The track also debuted on the Hot Country Songs chart at number 19 and Hot R&B/Hip-Hop Songs at number 36. After an "intense bidding war", Lil Nas X signed with Columbia Records in March 2019. Billboard controversially removed the song from the Hot Country songs chart in March 2019 telling Rolling Stone:

In Robert Christgau's opinion, "Taking 'Old Town Road' off the country chart strikes me as racist pure and simple, because country radio remains racist regardless of the Darius Ruckers and Kane Browns it makes room for." Another Billboard spokesperson told Genius, "Billboards decision to take the song off of the country chart had absolutely nothing to do with the race of the artist." Despite being removed from the main Country Songs chart, the song charted on Billboard's Country Airplay chart, debuting at 53, and peaking at 50. In response, Sony Music Nashville CEO Randy Goodman told Billboard that his team started testing the song in some country radio markets, adding "it would be negligent not to look at it". In May 2019, the issues of racism in country music culture came up again when Wrangler announced its Lil Nas X collection, and some consumers threatened a boycott. Media outlets also noted that the song brings attention to the historic cultural erasure of African-Americans from both country music and the American frontier era.

Country music star Billy Ray Cyrus supported "Old Town Road", and became the featured vocalist in an April 2019 remix, the first of several. That same month, Lil Nas X broke Drake's record for the most U.S. streams from one song in one week with 143 million streams for the week ending April 11, surpassing Drake's "In My Feelings", which had 116.2 million streams in a week in July 2018; as of August 2019 it has streamed over a billion plays on Spotify alone. In May 2019, the video was released and as of August 2019, has over 370 million views. NBC News's Michael Arceneaux wrote, "In the social media age, Lil Nas X is arguably the first micro-platform crossover star."

"Panini" was released as Lil Nas X's second single through Columbia Records on June 20, 2019. It is named after the fictional cabbit of the same name in the animated television series Chowder, and does not refer to the sandwich of the same name. In mid-September 2019 "Panini" had its first remix released with rapper DaBaby. Lil Nas X released his debut extended play, titled 7, on June 21, 2019. The EP debuted at number two on the Billboard 200 chart. On June 23, 2019, Lil Nas X performed with Cyrus at the 2019 BET Awards. On June 30, Lil Nas X made his international debut at the largest greenfield festival in the world, the UK's annual Glastonbury Festival, when he and Billy Ray Cyrus made a surprise appearance and joined Miley Cyrus for the song, before performing "Panini" solo in a set seen nationally on BBC. On the same day, Lil Nas X became one of the most visible Black queer male singers when he came out as gay. This was especially significant for an artist in the country and hip hop genres, both of which emphasize machismo and "historically snubbed queer artists". Black queer male artists in hip hop having mainstream acceptance arguably started in 2012 with Frank Ocean's coming out just before Channel Orange was released. Rolling Stone premiered the Rolling Stone Top 100 in early July with three Lil Nas X songs: "Rodeo" with Cardi B at number nine; "Panini" at four; and "Old Town Road" as the first-ever number-one song on the chart.

On August 19, 2019, Lil Nas X opened for Katy Perry at a concert Amazon held for its employees to celebrate its Prime Day sale.

2020–2022: Montero
On July 7, 2020, Lil Nas X revealed that his debut album was "almost finished". He also stated that he was working on a mixtape, and invited producers to submit their beats for his new music. On July 10, he teased the release of a new song titled "Call Me by Your Name", posting a snippet of it online. On November 8, 2020, he announced a new single, "Holiday", which was released on November 13. On Roblox, a virtual concert was held to promote Lil Nas X's single, with Lil Nas X-related items in the game's avatar shop. The single debuted at 37 on the Billboard Hot 100, while the song's music video accumulated tens of millions of views within the first several weeks of release.

In January 2021, he released a children's book, C Is for Country. The following month, he again previewed the song, "Montero (Call Me by Your Name)" in a Super Bowl LV commercial. The song was officially released on March 26, 2021, along with an accompanying music video. On the same day, Lil Nas X revealed that his debut album would be named Montero, and that it would be released in mid-2021. The video prompted strong reactions. The song was seen by many as a valuable expression of queerness, though prominent conservative and Christian figures accused Lil Nas X of sacrilege and devil worship. Despite the controversy, "Montero (Call Me by Your Name)", debuted at number one on the Billboard Hot 100, becoming Lil Nas X's second chart-topping single and third top-ten single.

On March 29, 2021, Lil Nas X partnered with New York-based art collective MSCHF to release a modified pair of Nike Air Max 97s called Satan Shoes, which may be seen on Satan's feet in the music video used to promote the release of "Montero (Call Me by Your Name)". The shoes are black and red with a bronze pentagram, filled with "60cc and 1 drop of human blood". Only 666 pairs were made at a price of $1,018. Nike said they were uninvolved in the creation and promotion of the shoes and did not endorse the messages of Lil Nas X or MSCHF. The company filed a trademark lawsuit against MSCHF in New York federal court. On April 1, the judge issued a temporary restraining order blocking the sale and distribution of the shoes pending a preliminary injunction. Lil Nas X responded to the lawsuit with a meme on Twitter showing himself as the character Squidward, homeless and asking for money. Later, he released a prelude video for the song "Industry Baby", which stages a fake "Nike vs. Lil Nas X" trial in the Supreme Court, during which people discuss the Satan Shoes before condemning the singer for being gay.

Following the controversies surrounding his previous song and its promotion, Lil Nas X released the more introspective single "Sun Goes Down" on May 21, 2021, wherein he reflects on his struggles with bullying and coming to terms with his homosexuality in his upbringing. He performed the song alongside "Montero (Call Me by Your Name)" at Saturday Night Live a day later, where he suffered a wardrobe malfunction during a pole dance routine when the seam of his trousers split, leaving him unable to finish it properly. On June 29, Lil Nas posted a promotional video of his debut album, ending it with Montero, the Album. He also posted a snippet of a previously teased track called "Industry Baby".

On July 16, Lil Nas X posted a video on TikTok claiming that he had an upcoming court hearing regarding the Satan Shoes three days later. However, on July 19, 2021, he posted a spoof of the legal debacle on YouTube, marketing his new single "Industry Baby". The song was released on July 23, featuring rapper Jack Harlow with production by Kanye West and Take a Daytrip. The song debuted at number two on the Billboard Hot 100 and reached number one on the chart for the ending week of October 23, 2021, becoming Lil Nas X's fourth top-ten single and third number one.

On September 17, 2021, Montero was released, along with its fourth single, "Thats What I Want". On October 23, 2021, Lil Nas X made a surprise appearance at Diplo's set at Electronic Daisy Carnival Las Vegas. During the appearance he performed "Industry Baby", "Montero (Call Me by Your Name)", and "Old Town Road".

On April 26, 2022, he announced his first concert tour, the Long Live Montero Tour. The tour was in support of Montero, and began in September 2022 and ran through January 2023.

2022–present: Upcoming second studio album
On March 16, 2022, Lil Nas X returned from his hiatus, and teased two songs from his "almost finished" new album, "Late to da Party" featuring YoungBoy Never Broke Again, and "Down Souf Hoes" featuring Saucy Santana. He also posted a preview of the track "Lean on My Body". On June 24, 2022, Lil Nas X released "Late to da Party", and later clarified via Twitter that it was "not a lead single". Lil Nas X said that the album would be "something fun, something for the summertime, something for the girls to get ready and party to".

On his Long Live Montero Tour, Lil Nas X performed his then-unreleased single Star Walkin' and the intro to Down Souf Hoes. On October 19, 2022, he invited Saucy Santana on his tour to perform an additional unheard verse of Down Souf Hoes.

On September 15, 2022, Riot Games, the developers of the video game League of Legends, announced a collaboration with Lil Nas X for the 2022 League of Legends World Championship through a press release, where they also declared him to be "President of League of Legends", in what Kotaku journalist Isaiah Colbert called a publicity stunt. The anthem for the tournament, "Star Walkin'", was released on September 22 with an accompanying animated music video. He is scheduled to perform the song at the opening ceremony of the tournament on November 5. Additionally, a custom outfit for a playable character in the game co-designed by Lil Nas X will be made available temporarily in November.

Musical style and influences
Lil Nas X's musical style has been described as pop rap, hip hop, country rap, trap, pop rock, pop, and rock.

He credits LGBTQ artists Frank Ocean and Tyler, the Creator as inspirations and for "making it easier for me to be where I am, comfortably." Lil Nas X also cites Nicki Minaj, Katy Perry, Drake, Miley Cyrus and Doja Cat as some of his biggest influences. In 2019 he said, "I grew up off the Internet, so my influences come from all over musically." He grew up listening to hip hop artists such as Andre 3000, Kendrick Lamar, Kid Cudi and Lil Uzi Vert.

Impact
In July 2019, Time named him one of the 25 most influential people on the Internet for his "global impact on social media", and "overall ability to drive news". In late July 2019, the MTV Video Music Award (VMA) nominations were announced, with Lil Nas X receiving eight. He performed "Panini", an "ode to the cartoon rabbit of the same name from Cartoon Network's Chowder", with a troupe of "Tron-inflected dancers" at the 2019 MTV VMAs, where he also won two awards: Song of the Year, for which he is the first openly LGBTQ person to do so; and the video's Calmatic for Best Direction. He was nominated for five fan-chosen 2019 Teen Choice Awards, winning Choice R&B/Hip-Hop Song for the Cyrus remix of "Old Town Road". "Old Town Road" is also the YouTube top song of the summer in the U.S. and over fifty other countries and territories; it is also their second top global song of the summer. Lil Nas X and Billy Ray Cyrus' remix also won the Country Music Association (CMA) Awards collaboration category, CMA Music Event of the Year; Lil Nas X is the first out gay man to ever be nominated for a CMA award, and the only openly LGBTQ person to win. Vox noted the Event Award is not a part of the CMA televised celebration, and they snubbed Lil Nas X from bigger appropriate categories. The "Old Town Road" remix with Cyrus has been nominated for a People's Choice Award for Song of 2019, Lil Nas X was also nominated for "Male Artist of 2019" at the 45th People's Choice Awards. In October, at the 2019 BET Hip Hop Awards Lil Nas X, with Cyrus, won for Best Collab/Duo or Group, and Single of the Year. In November 2019, Lil Nas X won the American Music Award for Favorite Rap/Hip Hop Song, he was nominated for four others including three for "Old Town Road" featuring Billy Ray Cyrus. In November 2019, Lil Nas X was nominated for six Grammy Awards, including Record of the Year, Album of the Year and Best New Artist, and eventually won Best Music Video and Best Pop Duo/Group Performance. Lil Nas X's success caused him to become the first person of color and the first openly gay performer to be listed by Forbes in its annual Highest-Paid Country Acts List.

Ken Burns, who produced the PBS documentary Country Music, noted,

In early July 2019, "Old Town Road" achieved its 13th week at the top spot on the Billboard 100, becoming the first hip hop song to do so. It is also the first song to sell 10 million copies while in the top spot. On its 15th week at the top, Lil Nas X became the first openly gay artist to have a song last as long, overtaking Elton John's 1997 Double A-Side—where both sides of the record are promoted as hits, "Candle in the Wind 1997"/"Something About the Way You Look Tonight". At 19 weeks at number one, Lil Nas X holds the record for the most weeks since the chart was first introduced in 1958. , the song has also charted 19 weeks atop the Hot R&B/Hip-Hop Songs chart; beating a three-way tie record. At 19 weeks at the top of the Hot Rap Songs chart the song has also beaten a three-way tie. By November 2019, the song was Diamond Certified, moving a combined sales and streaming 10 million units.

Public image
Lil Nas X has been noted for his public fashions; in July 2019, Vogue noted Lil Nas X as a "master" at giving the cowboy aesthetic a glam look in his appearances and on Instagram. His stylist, Hodo Musa, says he aims for items that are "electric, playful, colorful, and futuristic." For his onstage look at the 2019 MTV Video Music Awards he wore a cowboy motif cherry-red Nudie suit. Wrangler, which is mentioned in the "Old Town Road" lyrics, has consistently sold out of Lil Nas X co-branded fashions.

For the 62nd Annual Grammy Awards Lil Nas X wore several outfits including a head-to-toe couture fuchsia Versace suit with a pink harness that took 700 hours to construct.

In July 2020, Lil Nas X modeled in a trailer video for a new skincare line by Rihanna's Fenty Beauty.

In August 2021, Lil Nas X commented "Nah he tweakin" on an Instagram post about Tony Hawk selling skateboards painted with paint that contained his blood. It became a viral phenomenon for the next few days. In 2021, he appeared on the Time 100, Times annual list of the 100 most influential people in the world.

Personal life

Coming out
In early June 2019, Lil Nas X came out to his sister and father and he felt "the universe was signalling him to do so", despite his uncertainty whether his fans would stick by him or not. On June 30, 2019, the last day of Pride Month, Lil Nas X came out publicly as gay, tweeting: "some of y'all already know, some of y'all don't care, some of y'all not gone [fuck with me] no more. but before this month ends i want y'all to listen closely to c7osure. 🌈🤩✨" The tweet confirmed earlier suspicions when he first indicated this in his track "c7osure". Rolling Stone noted the song "touches on themes such as coming clean, growing up and embracing one's self". The next day he tweeted again, this time highlighting the rainbow-colored building on the cover art of his EP 7, with the caption reading "deadass thought i made it obvious". He was unambiguous in an interview several days later on BBC Breakfast, where he stated that he was gay and understands that his sexuality is not readily accepted in the country or rap music communities.

The response to the news was mostly positive, but also garnered a large amount of homophobic backlash on social media, to which Lil Nas X also reacted. The backlash also came from the hip hop community, drawing attention to homophobia in hip hop culture. In January 2020, rapper Pastor Troy made homophobic comments on the outfit Lil Nas X wore during the Grammy Awards, to which Lil Nas X responded: "Damn I look good in that pic on god."

In January 2023, Lil Nas X tweeted a new statement about his sexual orientation, writing "be [for real] would y’all be mad at me if i thought i was a little bisexual". The next day, he tweeted "that was my last time coming out the closet i promise".

Religion
Lil Nas X stated in September 2021 that he was an atheist "at one point," but is now "a very spiritual person in terms of the Universe, how everything works."

Accolades

Lil Nas X is the recipient of multiple awards including two Grammy Awards, five Billboard Music Awards, five MTV Video Music Awards, two BET Hip Hop Awards, two iHeartRadio Music Awards and two American Music Awards. He has also been awarded by Songwriters Hall of Fame as the youngest honoree of Hal David Starlight Award.

On September 1, 2021, The Trevor Project announced that Lil Nas X is the recipient of its inaugural Suicide Prevention Advocate of the Year award.

Discography

Studio albums
Montero (2021)

Tours
 Long Live Montero Tour (2022–23)

Filmography

Written works
C Is for Country (2021)

See also

 LGBT culture in New York City
 List of LGBTQ New Yorkers
 List of Billboard Hot 100 chart achievements and milestones
 List of artists who reached number one on the Billboard Hot 100
 List of most-streamed artists on Spotify
 List of bestselling singles worldwide
 LGBTQ+ representations in hip hop music

Notes

References

External links

 
 

1999 births
Living people
21st-century American singers
21st-century American male singers
African-American country musicians
African-American male rappers
American TikTokers
Columbia Records artists
Country musicians from Georgia (U.S. state)
Country rap musicians
American gay musicians
Grammy Award winners
LGBT rappers
LGBT African Americans
American LGBT singers
LGBT TikTokers
LGBT people from Georgia (U.S. state)
Pop rappers
Rappers from Atlanta
Southern hip hop musicians
University of West Georgia alumni
20th-century LGBT people
21st-century LGBT people
21st-century African-American male singers
Former atheists and agnostics
 
Trap musicians
American pop rock singers
Bisexual men
Bisexual singers
Bisexual songwriters